The Bachelor is a 1990 historical drama film directed by Roberto Faenza, based on the novel Dr. Gräsler, Badearzt by Arthur Schnitzler. It stars Keith Carradine, Miranda Richardson, Kristin Scott Thomas and Sarah-Jane Fenton. Set in the Austro-Hungarian Empire before the First World War, the film follows Doctor Emil Gräsler, a distinguished physician who is forced to choose between two women he loves.

Cast
 Keith Carradine as Doctor Emil Gräsler
 Miranda Richardson as Frederica / Widow
 Kristin Scott Thomas as Sabine
 Sarah-Jane Fenton as Katerina
 Mari Törőcsik as Mrs. von Schleheim
 Mario Adorf as L'amico di Gräsler
 Max von Sydow as Von Schleheim
 Franco Diogene

References

External links
 
 

1990 films
1990 drama films
1990s historical drama films
1990s English-language films
English-language Hungarian films
English-language Italian films
Films about physicians
Films based on Austrian novels
Films based on works by Arthur Schnitzler
Films directed by Roberto Faenza
Films scored by Ennio Morricone
Films set in the 1910s
Films set in Austria
Films shot in Budapest
Hungarian historical drama films
Italian historical drama films
Films set in Austria-Hungary
1990s Italian films